Euhadra sandai is a species of air-breathing land snail, a terrestrial pulmonate gastropod mollusk in the family Bradybaenidae.

Anatomy
This species of snail makes and uses love darts as part of its mating behavior.

Distribution
This snail is endemic to Japan.

References

External links 
 Shell images

Euhadra
Gastropods described in 1878